Before the 1998 season, the Major Indoor Lacrosse League was renamed to be the National Lacrosse League, in the process increasing the length of the regular season from ten to twelve games. The first season as the NLL and the 12th season overall, began on January 3, 1998, and concluded with the second championship game on April 28. The championship was decided by a best-two-of-three series, with the Philadelphia Wings defeating the Baltimore Thunder 16-12 in the first game and 17-12 in the second.

Team movement
The 1998 season featured the debut of two new teams, and the removal of one. The Boston Blazers folded after nine seasons in Boston and New England, while the Ontario Raiders and Syracuse Smash began play.

Regular season

All Star Game
No All-Star Game was played in 1998.

Playoffs

Game 1: Baltimore 12 @ Philadelphia 16  Game 2: Philadelphia 17 @ Baltimore 12

Awards

Weekly awards
Each week, a player is awarded "Player of the Week" honours.

Monthly awards
Awards are also given out monthly for the best overall player and best rookie. The 1998 season was the first season that the Rookie of the Month award was given out.

Statistics leaders
Bold numbers indicate new single-season records. Italics indicate tied single-season records.

See also
 1998 in sports

References
1998 Archive at the Outsider's Guide to the NLL (via the Internet Archive)

98
NLL